The Sons of Two Suns is an Emirati post apocalyptic science fiction short film directed by S. A. Zaidi and produced by Ghanem Ghubash, it is known to be the first science fiction film of United Arab Emirates.

Premise 
During the end of the world, three friends struggle to survive in Dubai. They search for shelter in an empty city devastated by two suns on the horizon.

Production 
The film was entirely shot outdoors during the peak summer months in Dubai in order to achieve the desired effect created by natural sunlight and extreme heat in the city. Some of the crew were hospitalized due to heat stroke.

Release 
The films trailer premiered at the Middle East Film and Comic Con Dubai. The film was released at the Gulf Film Festival and had its US premiere at Boston Science Fiction Film Festival.

Reception 
io9 mentioned ″Short film "Sons of Two Suns" is being billed as the UAE's first science fiction film. It's about a city that's dying of heat, and you couldn't ask for a better landscape than Dubai to film in.″ Vice (magazine) found "Dubai's First Sci-Fi Film Is a Reminder That Dubai Itself Is Not Actually Science Fiction, now that the city has produced its own sci-fi film, a surprise post-apocalyptic vision of a city torn apart by the approach of two suns.″ Virgin.com said "the film is steeped in heavy yellow filters as we gaze in wonder at Dubai's decline. Although not all that cheery, the film looks at the three survivors, and gives us a harsh look, from a Dubai perspective, what things could be like!″.

References

External links 

2013 films
Emirati science fiction films
Emirati short films
2010s Arabic-language films
2010s English-language films
Films set in Dubai
Post-apocalyptic films
Films shot in Dubai
2013 science fiction films
Emirati multilingual films
2013 multilingual films
2013 short films